The northern Idaho ground squirrel (Urocitellus brunneus)  is a species of the largest genus of ground squirrels. This species and the Southern Idaho ground squirrel were previously considered conspecific, together called the Idaho ground squirrel.

The species is about 233mm in length and weighs 120 to 290 grams. The northern Idaho ground squirrel has sexual dimorphism and a dark-reddish gray coat.

The squirrel hibernates for 8 months and lives in dry meadows in Adams and Valley Counties in western-central Idaho. They eat forbs, grasses, shrubs, trees, rushes, and sedges. The mating season occurs within two weeks from the start of the active period and lasts about 12–13 days. Females only have one litter per years and there is about five weaned babies per litter who leave the burrow around late March-early April. The species constructs three types of burrows- nest burrows, auxiliary burrows, and hibernation burrows.

In 2000, the species was classified as threatened under the Endangered Species Act mostly due to habitat loss. There are about 2000 individuals remaining, but the population is increasing resulting from conservation efforts. A recovery plan for the species was put in place by the U.S. Fish and Wildlife Service in 2003 and forest restoration for the species is anticipated to be done by 2027.

Description
The species has sexual dimorphism, with males being normally larger than females. Their weight ranges from 120 to 290 grams, and they are, on average, 233mm in length, though their range is 209mm to 258mm. They have a dark-reddish grey coat with reddish-brown spots. Some of the northern Idaho ground squirrel's qualities include: tan feet and ears, a tail, brownish-grey throat, and a white eye ring.

Diet and Life History
The northern Idaho ground squirrel has a 8 month hibernation period from August to late April. Their diet consists of mostly forbs, grasses, shrubs, trees, rushes, and sedges. The squirrels active season is from April to July, and then the species spends the rest of the year hibernating.
Within the first two weeks of the active period, the NIDGS starts reproducing. In the mating process, the male individuals protect the sexually receptive females from other potential male mates. The mating season occurs within 12–13 days. The males are kicked out from the burrow after mating with the female. Males do not act paternally. The gestation period of the species is 3.5 weeks. Juveniles do not leave the burrow until weaned (around late March- early April). There is about 5 weaned individuals per litter. One female only has one litter per year.

The NIDGS creates three different types of burrows. The nest burrows are for reproducing and raising young; they are usually 5–11 cm deep in well-drained soil with the nest resting at the deepest part of the burrow. The auxiliary burrows do not contain nests; they are less than 50 cm, built 100m from nest burrows, and are constructed in shallow soils. They also have a different burrow for hibernating that is only a single tunnel, called the hibernation burrow. The squirrels disperse the soil around their burrows instead of leaving a pile of soil at the opening, which makes the entrance of the burrows less visible.

Distribution and Habitat 
The habitat of the northern Idaho ground squirrel consists of dry rocky meadows. Ground with deep soil and scattered with ponderosa pine and Douglas-fir forests at the elevation between 915 to 1,650 meters is the preferred habitat of the squirrels. Original vegetation in the habitat of the NIDGS was big sage brush, bitterbrush, native bunch grasses, and forbs, but now the area contains cheatgrass and medusahead.During the winter, the NIDGS hibernates in environments with larger coverage compared to the active season habitats. The NIDGS mainly hibernates at a completely different habitat than the active season habitat.

The northern Idaho ground squirrel lives in the Adams and Valley Counties in western-central Idaho. The species used to occupy 1,600 km2, but now the species only occupies less than 20 km2.

Predators of the northern Idaho ground squirrel consist of: badgers, prairie falcons, Cooper's hawk, goshawks, red-tailed hawks, northern harriers, coyotes, and long-tailed weasels. The species only has one mating call for predators, which are given mostly by female individuals when the young leave the nest.

Conservation

Threats 
The main cause for the decreasing population of the species is habitat loss. In pre-settlement times, the squirrels lived in ponderosa pine forests containing meadow terrain. The Native Americans set fires to these forests, which introduced more open terrain in the forests for the squirrels to roam and allowed young trees to infill the meadows they inhabit. In 1910, a movement for fire suppression stopped these fires. Consistent logging efforts in the habitats of northern Idaho ground squirrels has caused the forests to grow back thicker, leaving no open space for the species. Habitat conversion into thicker and wetter environments has also made many original habitats unfit for the squirrels.  Grazing also significantly decreases habitats because the long grasses planted drives away the species. Another reason for the decreasing population of northern Idaho ground squirrels is purposeful killing. From 1933 to 1942, the Payette National Forest poisoned the squirrels because of an untrue assumption that they damaged trees. From 1930-1980, farmers poisoned many of squirrels in west-central Idaho for "pest control."

Status 
In 2000, the northern Idaho ground squirrel was classified as threatened under the Endangered Species Act. The species' conservation status is now endangered. The most recent numbers from the Idaho Department of Fish and Game suggest the total population of the species is about 2000 individuals. As the population continues to decline, the increased likelihood of inbreeding and decrease in genetic diversity continues to lead the northern Idaho ground squirrel into extinction.

Efforts 
The most recommended option for conserving the northern Idaho ground squirrel is habitat restoration. Since the species utilize two different habitats (one for hibernating in the winter and one for summer), the most effective conservation would be to restore both types of habitats.

The U.S. Fish & Wildlife Service put a recovery plan for the northern Idaho ground squirrel in place in 2003. The plan seeks to increase population size and create more metapopulations and care for them until they are self sufficient. For the plan to end, the effective population must increase to over 5,000 individuals. The plan is also using a captive breeding program, incase the effort to increase the wild populations goes extinct.

In August 2022, there was a 5-year review published by the U.S. Fish and Wildlife Service to assess the recovery plan and the species. The forest restoration for the squirrel is expected to be done by 2027. Forest thinning followed by prescribed fire and prescribed fire are begin used to restore the NIDGS habitat. 32 acres of land in the Payette National Forest received prescribed fire for the NIDGS habitat. The OX Ranch signed a Safe Harbor Agreement to support one of the largest populations of the NIDGS with 7,783 acres of land (the ranch has been a crucial part of conservation). The squirrel is still a threatened species.

References

External links 
Digital Atlas of Idaho entry from Idaho State University
Northern Idaho ground squirrel species profile from the United States Fish and Wildlife Service

Urocitellus
Mammals of the United States
Ground Squirrel, Idaho
Mammals described in 1928
ESA threatened species
Taxa named by Arthur H. Howell